Drakkar may refer to:
Drakkar Entertainment
Drakkar Productions, a French underground black metal record label
Baie-Comeau Drakkar, a junior ice hockey team
Drakkar Noir, a line of men's cologne marketed by Guy Laroche
Drakkar (band), an early-1970s Cambodian hard rock band
Drakkar Sauna, a country-folk band from Lawrence, Kansas
Drakkar, the name of the building in which 58 French paratroopers were killed in the 1983 Beirut barracks bombing
Drakar, a Viking longship